Gil's Thrilling (And Filling) Blog is an American blog, written by Gil Garduño, that specializes in reviewing restaurants in New Mexico, as well as across the United States. Though his reviews are widely regarded, his main source of income is his day job.

History
Garduño was born in Peñasco, New Mexico. As a young man, he joined the United States Air Force and was stationed in Boston, Massachusetts. He eventually moved to Mississippi. In 1995, he started his blog after returning to New Mexico, when he and his wife began exploring local restaurants.

Reception
The blog is a No. 1 Blog on Urbanspoon. It has also received mentions, been used as a resource, or been recommended by Jane and Michael Stern, Chowhound, Food Network and others.

See also
 List of websites about food and drink

References

External links
 

New Mexican cuisine
American blogs
Websites about food and drink